Inari (Norwegian and Swedish: Enare) is Finland's largest municipality by area (but one of the most sparsely populated), with four official languages, more than any other in the country. Its major sources of income are tourism, service industry and cold climate testing. With the Siida museum in the village of Inari, it is a center of Sami culture, widely known as the "capital of Sámi culture".

The airport in Ivalo and the country's key north-south European Route E75 (Finland's National Road 4) bring summer and winter vacationers seeking resorts with access to a well-preserved, uncrowded natural environment.

History
The municipality was established in 1876. It was claimed from about 1942 to 1945 by the Quisling regime during the Nazi occupation of Norway.

Geography
Inari is the largest municipality by area in Finland.

Finland's largest National Park Lemmenjoki is partly located in Inari, as is the Urho Kekkonen National Park. Vast parts of the municipality are designated wilderness areas: Hammastunturi, Muotkatunturi, Paistunturi, Kaldoaivi, Vätsäri, and Tsarmitunturi.

The village of Inari is Finland's northernmost holiday resort. The airport is located in the nearby village of Ivalo.

Climate

Inari has a chilly and humid climate with fairly cold winters and cool summers (Köppen Dfc). Due to the polar night, winter time temperatures are often severely cold. However, the midnight sun contributes to surprisingly high summertime temperatures. Inari is also among the driest locations in Finland, especially in the winter when the average precipitation total is less than half of the amount that Southern Finland receives. The driest year on record was 1941 when only 120,1 mm (4,7 inches) fell.

Demographics

Population
The population peaked in 1993, at 7,874. It then decreased continuously until 2012, when the population was 6,732. Since then it has steadily increased to 7,008 in 2021. Inari is expected to be the only municipality in Lapland, along with Rovaniemi, that will experience population growth by 2040. This has been attributed to increased tourism.

Its two largest villages are Ivalo and Inari. Other villages are Törmänen, Keväjärvi, Koppelo, Sevettijärvi–Näätämö, Saariselkä, Nellim, Angeli, Kaamanen, Kuttura, Lisma, Partakko, and Riutula.

The registered Sami population in Inari from the 2019 election was 2,141, which was 31% of Inari's population.

Languages
The municipality has four official languages: Finnish, Inari Sami (ca. 400 estimated speakers), Skolt Sami (ca. 400 speakers), and Northern Sami (ca. 700 speakers). The estimates of how many people have some command of each of the Sami languages differ from the number of people who list them as their mother tongues. Of the total population of 7,008 in 2021, 6,248 people registered Finnish (89.16%) and 475 people registered one of the Sami languages as their mother tongue (6.78%). Swedish is the mother tongue of 0.39% and 3.68% speak foreign-languages. The most spoken foreign-languages are Russian (0.86%), German (0.51%), French (0.31%), Dutch (0.22%) and English (0.20%).

Citizenship
Only about 3%, 214 persons, were citizens of countries other than Finland in 2021. Largest groups of foreign-citizens are from Russia, Germany, France, the Netherlands, Estonia and Thailand.

Politics

Results of the 2011 Finnish parliamentary election in Inari:

Centre Party   36.2%
True Finns   19.2%
Left Alliance   13.8%
National Coalition Party   10.5%
Social Democratic Party   9.8%
Green League   6.6%
Swedish People's Party   2.2%
Christian Democrats   1.2%
Other parties   0.5%

Sites of interest 

 Inari village
 Siida, Sámi Museum and Northern Lapland Nature Centre
 Sajos, Sami Cultural Center
 Ivalo village
 Ivalo Airport
 Ivalo river
 Saariselkä holiday resort
 Urho Kekkonen National Park
 Lemmenjoki National Park
 Hammastunturi Wilderness Area
 Otsamo fell, a popular hiking destination

See also 
 Utsjoki

References

External links

Municipality of Inari – official website

 
Sámi-language municipalities
Populated places established in 1876
Populated places of Arctic Finland
1876 establishments in Finland
Populated lakeshore places in Finland